Georg Forster ( – 12 November 1568) was a German editor, composer and physician.

Forster was born at Amberg, in the Upper Palatinate.  While a chorister at Elector Ludwig V’s court in Heidelberg around 1521, he was a colleague of Caspar Othmayr who would also become a composer of renown. Forster received his first instruction in composition from the Kapellmeister Lorenz Lemlin.  Forster died at Nuremberg.

References

External links

1510s births
1568 deaths
Renaissance composers
German classical composers
German male classical composers